Tony Yike Yang (born December 7, 1998) is a Canadian-Chinese pianist.

Early life

Yang was born on December 7, 1998 in Chongqing, China to Chinese parents. He and his parents immigrated to Toronto, Canada in 2004. He began his piano studies at the age of 5 with his mother as his first teacher.

Career 
Yang won fifth prize at the 17th International Chopin Piano Competition in 2015 at the age of 16 as the competition's youngest ever laureate. He was also the first prize winner of the Thomas & Evon Cooper International Competition and the Bösendorfer and Yamaha USASU International Junior Piano Competition. He has also been awarded with top prizes and honors at many other competitions such as the Hilton Head International Young Artists Piano Competition, the Gina Bachauer International Junior Piano Competition, and the Canadian National Chopin Competition while being the competition's youngest ever competitor.

He has performed extensively in Canada and the USA, while also making appearances in Europe and Asia. His performance highlights includes having performed in front of her Royal Highness Camilla, Duchess of Cornwall, Canadian PM Stephen Harper, and Polish President Andrzej Duda.

He has performed with the Cleveland Orchestra, Warsaw National Philharmonic Orchestra, Orchestre Métropolitain, Fort Worth Symphony Orchestra, Hunan Symphony Orchestra, Hilton Head Symphony Orchestra, Ottawa Symphony Orchestra, Edmonton Symphony Orchestra, Saskatoon Symphony Orchestra, Toronto Sinfonietta, Toronto Festival Orchestra, and The Royal Conservatory of Music's Academy Symphony Orchestra. In addition, he has also made appearances at the Chopin and his Europe International Music Festival, Shanghai International Piano Festival, Oberlin-Lake Como Academy, Festival de Lanaudière, Stratford Summer Music Festival, Canadian Chopin Festival, Bravo Niagara, Wintergreen Music, and the International Niagara Music Festival.

He has been featured on many television programs, including the "Inspiration Generation" series on the Global Television Network where he was selected as one of six outstanding Canadian young people, demonstrating the talents and excellence of Canadians. He was named CBC Music's Classical Young Artist of 2016, and was also featured as one of their 25 hot Canadian musicians under 25.

Awards
 Fifteenth Van Cliburn International Piano Competition: Jury Discretionary Award (2017)
 XVII International Chopin Piano Competition: 5th prize (2015)
 First Cliburn International Junior Piano Competition: Jury Discretionary Award (2015)
 Canadian National Chopin Competition: 2nd prize, Prize for the Best Performance of Mazurkas (2014)
 Thomas & Evon Cooper International Competition: 1st prize (2014)
 Hilton Head International Piano Competition for Young Artists: 3rd prize (2013)
 Bösendorfer and Yamaha USASU International Junior Piano Competition: 1st prize (2013)
 Gina Bachauer International Junior Piano Competition: 2nd prize (2012)
 Canadian Music Competition: 1st prize (2009, 2011)

Discography
 2016: Tony Yike Yang – Chopin: Sonata B-Moll / Ballada F-Moll / Mazurki, Fryderyk Chopin Institute

Personal life
Yang resides in Toronto, Canada. He is a graduate of  Cardinal Carter Academy for the Arts. He is currently a student in the Harvard University and New England Conservatory of Music joint-degree program, where he is studying with Alexander Korsantia. In the past, Yang has also studied at the Juilliard School and The Phil and Eli Taylor Performance Academy for Young Artists at The Royal Conservatory of Music.

References

 
 
 
 
 
 
 
 

1998 births
Canadian classical pianists
Male classical pianists
Living people
Place of birth missing (living people)
Canadian people of Chinese descent
21st-century classical pianists
21st-century Canadian male musicians